The 2012 FIM Swedish Speedway Grand Prix was the fourth race of the 2012 Speedway Grand Prix season. It took place on May 26 at the Ullevi stadium in Gothenburg, Sweden.

The Grand Prix was won by Fredrik Lindgren who beat Greg Hancock, Chris Holder and wild card Thomas H. Jonasson. It was the first SGP won by Lidngren.

Riders 
The Speedway Grand Prix Commission nominated Thomas H. Jonasson as Wild Card, and Linus Sundström and Simon Gustafsson both as Track Reserves. The Draw was made on May 25.

Heat details

Heat after heat 
 (67,2) N. Pedersen, Jonasson, Ljung, Harris
 (67,1) Lindbäck, Hampel, Lindgren, Gollob
 (67,3) Sayfutdinov, Jonsson, Bjerre, Hancock
 (67,4) Crump, Holder, B. Pedersen, Andersen
 (68,2) Bjerre, Hampel, Andersen, Harris
 (68,5) Sayfutdinov, Jonasson, Lindgren, Crump
 (68,7) Jonsson, Ljung, B. Pedersen, Gollob (F)
 (67,4) N. Pedersen, Holder, Hancock, Lindbäck
 (68,3) Lindgren, Holder, Jonsson, Harris (R)
 (68,9) Hancock, Jonasson, Hampel, B. Pedersen
 (69,7) Ljung, Crump, Lindbäck, Bjerre
 (68,3) N. Pedersen, Sayfutdinov, Gollob, Andersen
 (69,2) Gollob, Crump, Hancock, Harris
 (69,2) Jonsson, Jonasson, Andersen, Lindbäck
 (68,6) Holder, Hampel, Sayfutdinov, Ljung
 (69,1) N. Pedersen, B. Pedersen, Bjerre, Lindgren
 (69,0) Harris, Sayfutdinov, Lindbäck, B. Pedersen
 (67,7) Holder, Gollob, Jonasson, Bjerre
 (68,8) Hancock, Lindgren, Andersen, Ljung
 (68,3) Crump, N. Pedersen, Jonsson, Hampel
 Semifinals
 (69,4)21. Hancock, Jonasson, Crump, N. Pedersen (X)
 (69,1)22. Holder, Lindgren, Sayfutdinov, Jonsson
 the Final
 (69,1)23. Lindgren, Hancock, Holder, Jonasson

The intermediate classification

References

See also 
 motorcycle speedway

Sweden
2012
Speedway Grand Prix Sweden